The Roseires Dam is a dam on the Blue Nile at Ad Damazin, just upstream of the town of Er Roseires, in Sudan. It consists of a concrete buttress dam 1 km wide with a maximum height of 68 m, and an earth dam on either side. The earth dam on the eastern bank is 4 km long, and that on the western bank is 8.5 km long. The reservoir has a surface area of about 290 km2.

The dam was completed in 1966, initially for irrigation purposes. A power generation plant, with a maximum capacity of 280 megawatts, was added in 1971. A heightening (and lengthening) project was completed in 2013 and the dam is now 25 km long.

References

External links 
 Sudan Government: Dams Implementation Unit
 Sudan, Electric power. Library of Congress
 Africa Dams Briefing 2010 - International Rivers p. 54
 Vintage Project Management - The tamers of rivers 1966

Dams in Sudan
Blue Nile
Dams in the Nile basin
Dams completed in 1966